Stenoptilia tenuis is a moth of the family Pterophoridae. It is known from Bolivia, Colombia, Ecuador and Peru.

The wingspan is 18–23 mm. Adults are on wing from February to May.

References

tenuis
Moths described in 1875
Moths of South America
Taxa named by Alois Friedrich Rogenhofer